The Tientsin–Pukow Railway Operation (early August to mid November, 1937) was a follow up operation to the Battle of Beiping-Tianjin of the Japanese army in North China at the beginning of the Second Sino-Japanese War, fought concurrently with the Beiping–Hankou Railway Operation. The Tientsin–Pukow Railway Operation was not authorized by Imperial General Headquarters. The Japanese advanced following the line of the Tianjin-Pukou Railway aiming to the Yangtze River without meeting much resistance. The Japanese advance stopped at Jinan  on Yellow River after majority of the participating Japanese forces were redirected for the Battle of Taiyuan and replaced by parts of the newly formed 109th division.

Aftermath
After the stalemate at Yellow River from November 1937 to March 1938, the fighting resumed resulting in Battle of Xuzhou.

See also
 Order of Battle Tianjin–Pukou Railway Operation

References

Battles of the Second Sino-Japanese War
1937 in China
1937 in Japan
Conflicts in 1937